Shkotovo is an urban locality (an urban-type settlement) and a railway station in Shkotovsky District of Primorsky Krai, Russia. Population:

History
It was founded in 1865 as a village at the mouth of the Tsymukhe River (now Shkotovka River) on the Ussuri Bay and was granted urban-type settlement status in 1931. It is named after Nikolay Shkot.

Economy
There are a car repair service, a tinned food plant, and a dairy factory in Shkotovo.

References

Urban-type settlements in Primorsky Krai
Populated coastal places in Russia
Ports and harbours of the Russian Pacific Coast
Populated places established in 1865
1865 establishments in the Russian Empire